Geek's Guide to the Galaxy is a science fiction book podcast.

History 
The show is produced for Wired.com and hosted by author David Barr Kirtley. It was created by Kirtley and John Joseph Adams, who served as co-host for the first hundred episodes and is currently a producer on the show. Each episode typically includes either an interview with an author or other media personality, or a moderated panel segment featuring a group of "guest geeks." Season 1 (2010) was produced for Tor.com, the website of Tor Books, a science fiction book publisher. Season 2 (2011) was produced for io9, a science fiction and futurism website owned by Gawker Media. Seasons 3–9 (2012–2018) were produced for the tech magazine Wired.

References

External links 
 

Audio podcasts
Science fiction podcasts
Science fiction websites
2010 podcast debuts